Kotenevka is a rural locality (a selo) in Starooskolsky District, Belgorod Oblast, Russia. The population was 200 as of 2010. There are 7 streets.

Geography 
Kotenevka is located 16 km southwest of Stary Oskol (the district's administrative centre) by road. Verkhne-Chufichevo is the nearest rural locality.

References 

Rural localities in Starooskolsky District